The Willys L134 (nicknamed Go Devil) is a straight-4 automobile engine that was made famous in the Willys MB and Ford GPW Jeep produced during World War II. It powered nearly all the Jeep vehicles built for the U.S. and Allies. It was later used in a variety of civilian Jeep vehicles.

History
In 1940, the Willys Quad was built to compete against the Bantam reconnaissance car for evaluation by the U.S. Army. The two prototype Quads were powered by the Willys “Go-Devil” engine that turned out to be the automaker's greatest asset. Willys' pilot vehicle was overweight compared to the Army's requirements, but the "Go Devil" engine rated at  included a heavier transmission, a combination that proved to be beneficial in the long-run for use in cross-country travel.

The engine was developed by Willys' Chief Engineer, Delmar "Barney" Roos, and was the most powerful of the three prototype vehicles evaluated by the U.S. Army for production. Roos took the "less than impressive"  automobile engine and increased its performance and durability. The specifications by the Quartermaster Corps called for only  of torque at the rear axle. The extra power made it the engine of choice for the U.S. Army.

It was an L-head design, with valves parallel with the cylinders.

The L134 was phased out by the F-head Willys Hurricane engine beginning in 1950.

Applications
1937–1942 Willys Americar
1941–1945 Willys MB
1941–1945 Ford GPW
1944–1945 Willys-Overland CJ-2
1945–1949 Willys-Overland CJ-2A
1946–1950 Willys Jeep Station Wagon in which it was rated at 
1949–1953 Willys-Overland CJ-3A
1948–1950 Willys-Overland Jeepster
1950–1952 Willys M38
1950–1954 Henry J
1952–1954 IAME Rastrojero
1956–1965 Willys DJ-3a
1956–1965 Hotchkiss M201 (Willys MB produced under licence in France)

References

External links 

Go Devil
Gasoline engines by model
Straight-four engines